Daniel Fidelin (born 25 May 1948) was a member of the National Assembly of France.  He represents the Seine-Maritime department,  and is a member of the Union for a Popular Movement.

References

1948 births
Living people
People from Fécamp
Union for a Popular Movement politicians
The Popular Right
Mayors of places in Normandy
Deputies of the 12th National Assembly of the French Fifth Republic
Deputies of the 13th National Assembly of the French Fifth Republic
The Republicans (France) politicians